Accommodation of Crews (Supplementary Provisions) Convention, 1970 is  an International Labour Organization Convention.
It was ratified by the ILO's Governing Body in Geneva October 14, 1970, as a supplement to the Accommodation of Crews Convention (Revised), 1949.

Content 
The earlier convention considered such shipboard matters as:
 sleeping accommodation,
 mess and recreation rooms,
 ventilation,
 heating,
 lighting, and
 sanitary facilities.

The supplementary provisions were needed because of significant changes in the construction and operation of merchant vessels.

The provisions apply to sea-going ships, publicly or privately owned, engaged in cargo transport, passengers trade, or any other commercial purpose, registered in a territory which ratified the convention.  It does not apply to ships built before the provisions came into force, and to some classes of vessels such as ships of less than 1,000 tons, ships primarily propelled by sail, ships engaged in fishing or whaling, and hydrofoils and air-cushion craft.

Articles 1 through 4 of the provisions cover which vessels are subject to the provisions, definitions, and certain legal requirements for countries which adopt the Convention.

Article 5 deals with standards for sleeping quarters.  This includes the minimum square-footage of sleeping quarters and the number of persons that can be assigned to one room.  It also specifies that the chief engineer and the chief officer shall have a sitting room or day room adjoining their cabin.

Article 6 is concerned with mess rooms.  It specifies square footage and the availability of a refrigerator, and facilities for hot beverages and cool water.

Article 7 addresses recreation rooms.  It specifies that a recreation room must include a bookcase, facilitate reading and writing, if possible, be suitable for playing games.  It goes on to require that larger ships must have a smoking room or library set up to show films or television.  These larger ships are also required to have a hobby and games room.  It also recommends that a swimming pool be provided.

Article 8 is concerned with sanitary facilities.  This includes the provision of washbasins, bathrooms, and bathtubs or showers.  It also requires that when women are employed on board a vessel that they have separate sanitary facilities.  Article 8 also requires that facilities for washing, drying and ironing clothes be made available.

Article 9 requires that ships to which it applies provide a toilet and sink with hot and cold running water be provided in rooms near the navigation bridge and engine room.   It also requires a changing and locker room for engine room personnel.

Article 10 requires that, with some exceptions, headroom in crew accommodation spaces may not be less than 198 cm or 6 feet 6 inches.

Article 11 is concerned with lighting.  It requires that crew accommodation spaces be properly lighted.  It includes requirements for the provision of natural and artificial lights, and the provision of emergency lighting as required.  It also requires that a reading lamp be located at the head of each bed.

Article 12 allows a certain flexibility in the rules to accommodate "crews having differing and distinctive religious and social practices."

Ratifications
As of 2022, the convention has been ratified by 32 states. Of the ratifying states, 22 have denounced the treaty.

Notes

External links
Text.
Ratifications.

International Labour Organization conventions
Treaties concluded in 1970
Treaties entered into force in 1991
Treaties of Azerbaijan
Treaties of Belize
Treaties of Brazil
Treaties of Ivory Coast
Treaties of West Germany
Treaties of Guinea
Treaties of Israel
Treaties of Italy
Treaties of Kyrgyzstan
Treaties of Lebanon
Treaties of Moldova
Treaties of New Zealand
Treaties of Nigeria
Treaties of Romania
Treaties of Tajikistan
Treaties of Turkey
Treaties of Ukraine
Treaties of the United Kingdom
Treaties of Uruguay
Admiralty law treaties
Treaties extended to Gibraltar
Treaties extended to British Hong Kong
1970 in labor relations